Subby Valentine is an Australian comedian and radio presenter.  Valentine came to prominence in 1997 after winning Raw Comedy, a national competition for new comic talent. He has since worked as a writer and performer for radio, free-to-air television, and pay TV.

Valentine mastered his trade on the Sydney stand up comedy circuit for ten years. It was during this time that he sparked a relationship with fellow comic Tom Gleeson. The two would go on to form a duo and make the move to radio.

Valentine was a co-host of the Tom and Subby Show, which aired first on radio Triple J and later on Triple M. From there he worked as a writer for the Ten Network's SkitHouse as well as 2Day FM breakfast presenters Wendy Harmer and Greg Fleet.

In 2006, Subby started work as one of the rotating male guests on the Mix 106.5 breakfast show Sammy and the Boys. It was from this that, in June of that year, Subby joined Mix 106.5 on a permanent basis as part of Sammy, Subby and Alan for breakfast with Sammy Power and Spicks and Specks star Alan Brough. Following Brough's departure at the end of 2006, Subby stayed on with Sammy to form Sammy and Subby in the Morning on Mix 106.5 for 2007.

In 2009, Subby worked as a writer on the short lived Channel 7 show TV Burp. In 2010, he worked as head writer on The Matty Johns Show, also on Channel 7. He has since gone on to further writing jobs, including Australian Top Gear, Anh Does Vietnam, Anh Does and Britain, and Celebrity Splash. In 2013, Subby worked as a writer for the second series of Tractor Monkeys on ABC TV. and was a writer and performer on 'The Full Brazilian', a show on SBS for the 2014 Football World Cup.

Subby is a regular contributor on the popular "Thank God it's Friday" segment of Richard Glover's Drive program on 702 ABC Sydney. He is part of a rotating panel of comedians which includes Wendy Harmer, Tommy Dean, and Rebecca De Unamuno.

In 2016 Subby has been a regular panelist with Peter Berner on 'The B Team' on SKY News.

References

Australian male comedians
Living people
Year of birth missing (living people)